Haematomicrobium sanguinis is a species of bacteria from the family Micrococcaceae which has been isolated from human blood in Stockholm, Sweden.

References

Micrococcaceae
Bacteria described in 2009
Monotypic bacteria genera